Aptostichus simus is a species of trapdoor spider in the family Euctenizidae. It is a medium-sized mygalomorph found in the United States and Mexico.

References

Spiders of Mexico
Spiders of the United States
Euctenizidae
Spiders described in 1917